Football Club Mondercange is a football club, based in Mondercange, in south-western Luxembourg.

In the 2005–06 season, Mondercange finished third in the Division of Honour.  This qualified Mondercange for a play-off with FC Avenir Beggen, which they won, granting them promotion into the National Division.  They were relegated the following season from the National Division, back to the Division of Honour. In 2008–09 the club finished 2nd in the Division of Honour and were promoted to the National Division.

Honours
Luxembourg Cup
Runners-up: 1998–99, 1999–2000

European competition

FC Mondercange have qualified for UEFA European competition once.

UEFA Cup
Qualifying round (1): 1999–00

Overall, Mondercange's record in European competition reads:

Current squad

External links
 FC Mondercange official website

 
Mondercange
Mondercange
1933 establishments in Luxembourg